The Jefferson Theatre is a historic performing arts theatre located on Fannin Street in downtown Beaumont, Texas.  Designed by Emile Weil and built in 1927, it is an example of Old Spanish architecture and seats over 1400. The theatre was built by Jefferson Amusement Company, which was owned by Saenger Amusements. The theatre is featured on the National Register of Historic Places and recognized as a Recorded Texas Historic Landmark.  The theatre recently underwent a comprehensive multimillion-dollar renovation. It is also one of the few theatres in the country containing its original Morton organ, produced by the Robert Morton Organ Company.

History
Designed by the renowned architect Emile Weil, the Jefferson Theatre opened November 14, 1927 at a cost of nearly $1 million. Originally designed for Jefferson Amusement Company the theatre boasts a 3-manual, 8-rank Robert Morton organ. "It's A Wonderful Life" 1946 premier was held at the Jefferson Theatre, with star James Stewart and director Frank Capra in attendance. The theatre closed in 1972 due to a loss of interest in downtown.

By 1997 the theatre was operational again, but was closed in September 2000 for a complete restoration and renovation. The 6.5 million dollar restoration was completed in 2003.  , the City of Beaumont operates the theatre while the Jefferson Theatre Preservation Society oversees the preservation, promotion and use of the theatre.

Performances
Since the renovation, a number of high-profile artists have performed at the theatre, including Joan Rivers, The Temptations, Lou Rawls, George Carlin, Doobie Brothers, and Lyle Lovett. The theatre also hosts various local acts and events and is home to an annual film festival.

Hurricane Rita
In September 2005, the Vince Vaughn Wild West Comedy Show performance was canceled due to Hurricane Rita (which damaged the theatre and prompted a temporary closure for maintenance and repairs).  The theatre reopened for business in December 2005.

Photo gallery

See also

National Register of Historic Places listings in Jefferson County, Texas
Recorded Texas Historic Landmarks in Jefferson County
Julie Rogers Theater, Beaumont, Texas

References

External links

Theatres in Texas
Theatres on the National Register of Historic Places in Texas
Recorded Texas Historic Landmarks
Buildings and structures in Beaumont, Texas
Emile Weil buildings
Theatres completed in 1927
Tourist attractions in Beaumont, Texas
National Register of Historic Places in Jefferson County, Texas
Public venues with a theatre organ
Music venues in Beaumont, Texas